Turlinia is a monotypic moth genus in the subfamily Arctiinae. Its single species, Turlinia phalaenoides, is found on Madagascar. Both the genus and authority were first described by Hervé de Toulgoët in 1976.

References

Lithosiini